Thekkathara Gopalakrishnan Purushothaman (born 6 June 1979), popularly known as T. G. Purushothaman, is a former Indian professional football player, who currently works as the manager of the under-18 team of Indian Super League club Kerala Blasters. He is also the assistant manager of Kerala Blasters reserves.

Playing career
Born on 6 June 1979, Purushothaman spent his youth career by playing for Kerala Varma College and University of Calicut. In 2000, he signed his first senior contract with SBT. After an impressive performance with the side, he was included in the Kerala football team's squad for the 2001–02 Santosh Trophy tournament. His first achievement as a player also came in that tournament as the Kerala team won the championship. He later signed for the National Football League Vasco Goa in 2003 ahead of their new season. In 2004, Purushothaman moved to Mahindra United F.C. ahead of the 2005–06 National Football League. The season gave positive results to Mahindra, as they rose to win the league title, and the 2005 Federation Cup, thus helping Purushothaman to win two major silverware in his career. In the same year, he won the Santosh Trophy for the second time in his career with Kerala. On 11 June 2007, it was announced that Purushothaman was signed by Viva Kerala for the 2007–08 I-League campaign. He spent his last years of playing career with the Kerala club, before retiring in 2008 to pursue his career in coaching.

Coaching career
After retiring from professional football, he joined then Ernakulam Second Division and later I-League 2nd Division club Josco FC  in 2010, as their assistant coach under T.K. Chathunni. He was their assistant manager for the 2011 and 2013 I-League 2nd Division seasons respectively. He spent four years with the club before joining FC Kerala in 2014. At FC Kerala, which was founded in 2014, he also served as one of their directors. Under his assistance, the club made their second division debut in the 2017–18 season. Purushothaman also served as the assistant coach of the Kerala football team for the 2019–20 Santosh Trophy tournament. On 6 February 2021, Kerala Blasters announced that they have roped in Purushothaman as the new head coach of their reserves team. While being the manager of the Blasters' reserve team, he was again chosen by KFA as the assistant manager of the Kerala football team for the 2021–22 Santosh Trophy, who eventually won the tournament.

Honours

As a player
Santosh Trophy: 2001–02, 2004–05
National Football League: 2005
Federation Cup: 2005

As a manager 

 Santosh Trophy: 2021–22 (assistant)

References

External links 

 

1979 births
Living people
Footballers from Kerala
Kerala Blasters FC non-playing staff
Indian football managers
Indian footballers
Santosh Trophy players
Kerala Blasters FC Reserves and Academy head coaches
Association footballers not categorized by position